is a former Japanese football player.

Playing career
Nakai was born in Otsu on June 19, 1984. After graduating from high school, he joined J1 League club Kashiwa Reysol in 2003. However he could not play at all in the match. In 2005, he moved to J2 League club Mito HollyHock. On July 2, he debuted as substitute midfielder against Sagan Tosu. However he could hardly play in the match. He retired end of 2005 season.

Club statistics

References

External links

1984 births
Living people
Association football people from Shiga Prefecture
Japanese footballers
J1 League players
J2 League players
Kashiwa Reysol players
Mito HollyHock players
Association football midfielders